Mousa Basheer Mousa Farawi (born 22 March 1998) is a Palestinian footballer who plays as a defender for Hilal Al-Quds and the Palestine national team.

References

External links
 
 

1998 births
Living people
Footballers from Jerusalem
Palestinian footballers
Association football defenders
Hilal Al-Quds Club players
West Bank Premier League players
Palestine youth international footballers
Palestine international footballers
Footballers at the 2018 Asian Games